Chirk Aqueduct is a  high and  long navigable aqueduct that carries what is now the Llangollen Canal across the Ceiriog Valley near Chirk, on the England-Wales border, spanning the two countries.

History
The aqueduct was designed by civil engineer Thomas Telford for the Ellesmere Canal. The resident engineer was M. Davidson who also acted as resident engineer on a number of Telford's other works. The foundation stone was laid on 17 June 1796 and it was completed in 1801. It has a cast iron trough within which the water is contained. The masonry walls hide the cast iron interior. The aqueduct followed Telford's innovative Longdon-on-Tern Aqueduct on the Shrewsbury Canal, and was a forerunner of the Pontcysyllte Aqueduct, also on the Llangollen Canal. The aqueduct was briefly the tallest navigable one ever built, and it now is Grade II* listed in both England and Wales. It forms part of the Pontcysyllte Aqueduct World Heritage Site.

Description

The stone work is yellow sandstone. William Hazledine provided the ironwork for the aqueduct. Originally built with iron plates only at the base of the trough, iron side plates were added to the aqueduct in 1870 to alleviate leakage.

The Chirk Tunnel starts at the north end of the Chirk Aqueduct, allowing the canal to continue on towards Llangollen. Chirk Railway Viaduct was built later alongside the aqueduct. It is slightly higher than the aqueduct.

See also

List of canal aqueducts in the United Kingdom
List of bridges in Wales

References

External links

Chirk Aqueduct at chirk.com
360 Degree Panoramic View at BBC Shropshire (Java Applet Required)

Bridges in Wrexham County Borough
Buildings and structures in Shropshire
Navigable aqueducts in Wales
Bridges by Thomas Telford
Bridges completed in 1801
Llangollen Canal
Ellesmere Canal
Grade II* listed buildings in Shropshire
Grade II* listed buildings in Wrexham County Borough
Grade II* listed bridges in Wales
Cast iron aqueducts
Chirk